Mann Vannda (born 22 January 1997), known professionally as VannDa is a popular rapper, hip-hop artist based in Cambodia best known for one of his masterpieces "Time to Rise", featuring Master Kong Nai and one of Cambodia's most exciting contemporary artists, according to NME.

Early life 
VannDa was born on January 22, 1997, in Sihanoukville (city), Preah Sihanouk province, Cambodia. VannDa's father Mann Bunnheng and mother Kang Kimseak run a family-run coconut-shaving business in Psar Leur, a local market in the middle of Sihanoukville city. VannDa has two older siblings, Sophy and VannDy. VannDa has had a passion for music from a young age and has always dreamed of being a star. VannDa grew up discovering music online and considers music as his friend that takes him away from dark paths. VannDa looks up to rapper Kanye West and Kid Cudi.

Career 
After several independent releases from 2016 to 2018, In 2019, VannDa joined Baramey Production, a Cambodian talent management and music production company founded by Cambodian-American singer-songwriter Laura Mam that champions the Khmer original music movement.

Time to Rise
Originally released as part of a marketing campaign for mobile network Cellcard, "Time to Rise" blends traditional Khmer instrumentation and singing with hip-hop. The song features celebrated chrieng chapei artist Master Kong Nay, who contributes chapei playing and sings verses. The lyrics serve as a call to arms for Cambodian youth to preserve the traditions and knowledge of the past and carry the torch into the future, bringing originality and creativity to Cambodia's modern cultural scene. The song quickly became a legitimate pop hit, surpassing one-million views in three months.

The music video was filmed at the National Museum of Cambodia in Phnom Penh, showcasing the building's unique architecture, and features VannDa and Master Kong Nay in traditional Khmer clothing.

In October 2022, the music video for ‘Time to Rise’ reached 100 million views on YouTube, a first for a Cambodian artist.

On October 25, VannDa announced a 100 million riel (approx. US$25,000) fundraising campaign to support Kong Nay, whose health has seen decline in 2022.

Achievements
 First Cambodian musical artist to reach 100 million views on YouTube
 Time To Rise named Best Video of the year (2021) by LiFTED Asia
 Ranked #6 in LiFTED Asia's Top 50 artists of 2022

Discography 
 គេជាអ្នកណា (2016)
 ឈឺទេ (2017)
 ចាប់ផ្ដើម និង បញ្ចប់ (2018)
 $kull the Album (2020)
 SKULL 2: SEASON 1 (2021-2022)

Collaborations 
VannDa has collaborated with various Cambodian artists including label mate and rising rising R’n’B singer Sophia Kao, La Cima Cartel, as well as Thai rappers , 1MILL and OG Bobby. 
 Player ft. Temp Tris, Rawyer, Snooga, Reezy  (2018) 
 ម្តាយ (MAMA) ft. ក្មេងខ្មែរ (2020) 
 Follow Ma Dance ft. ប៉ូឡារិច, ឡូរ៉ាម៉ម, ក្មេងខ្មែរ (2020) 
 HIK HIK (FEAT. BAD BOY BERT) (2020) 
 Time feat. Sophia Kao (2021) 
 Time To Rise feat. Master Kong Nay (2021) 
 MONSOON - ft. Songha (2021) 
 RUN THE TOWN - ft. F.HERO, 1MILL & SPRITE (2022) 
 Young Man (feat. OG BOBBY) (2022) 
 BONG (feat. OG BOBBY) (2022)

References

External links 
 Official facebook page
 VannDa on Youtube
 Baramey Production

Music-related YouTube channels
Hip hop singers
21st-century Cambodian male singers
Khmer-language singers
Male rappers
1997 births
Living people
21st-century rappers
People from Sihanoukville province